Donald Robinson (born June 17, 1983, in Napa, California) is an American professional "New/Current School" Bicycle Motocross (BMX) racer whose prime competitive years are from 1999 to the present. His moniker is "dR", his initials. The use of the lowercase "d" for his given name is perhaps related to his relatively diminutive physical size. A past nickname, "Scrawny", was definitely linked to his small stature, since even when very young he was the smallest child in his age group. It was given to him by Bruce Minton. Like BMX predecessors Mike Miranda and Eric Rupe, Robinson is a devout Christian. He admitted in late 2013 to suffering at least 25 concussions over the course of his career. In the same interview, he advocated for better concussion protocol at the lower levels of BMX racing. Robinson joined the board of directors of concussion-education collaborative The Knockout Project in January 2013.

On June 25, 2008, Robinson was chosen by Mike King, team coach of the 2008 USA BMX Olympic Team, to represent the USA along with teammates Jill Kintner, Mike Day, and Kyle Bennett in BMX racing competition at the Beijing 2008 Summer Olympics. His Olympic dream was realized at least in part when he came in third at the Summer Olympics winning a Bronze Medal executing a maneuver that saw Sifiso Nhlapo take out nearly half the field. Since it was the sport's debut and the men's final was run after the women's, he became the third American and the sixth person overall to win an Olympic Medal in BMX Racing. Jill Kintner won the Bronze medal; Mike Day won the Silver medal. Kyle Bennett finished sixth in his semi-final and as a result did not qualify for the finals. Robinson announced his retirement of the sport at the 2016 USA BMX Grand Nationals.

Racing career milestones

Note: Professional firsts are on the national level unless otherwise indicated.

*In the NBL "B" Pro/Super Class/"A" Pro/Junior Elite Men depending on the era; in the ABA it is "A" Pro.
**In the NBL it is "AA" Pro/Elite Men; in the ABA it is "AA" Pro.

Career factory and major bike shop sponsors

Note: This listing denotes only the racer's primary sponsors. At any given time a racer could have numerous ever-changing co-sponsors. Primary sponsorships can be verified by BMX press coverage and sponsors' advertisements at the time in question. When possible exact dates are given.

Amateur
USA Wheel Sports: 1989-1991
CFC Racing: 1992-December 1994
Hyper Bicycles: December 1994-Late 1995
Powerlite Industries: Late 1995-December 2001; Robinson turned pro with this sponsor.

Professional
Powerlite Industries: Late 1995-December 2001
Fly Racing/Staats Bicycles: December 2001-December 2002
Factory Phantom/Avent Cycles/Fly Racing: December 2002 – 2004
Avent/Bombshell/Fly Racing: 2004-2005
Formula Bicycle Company/HP: February 2006-December 2007.
Hewlett-Packard/AT&T: January 2008-March 23, 2008
Hyper Bicycles: March 24, 2008 - February 8, 2013

Career bicycle motocross titles

Note: Listed are district, state/provincial/department, regional, national, and international titles in italics. Only sanctioning bodies that existed during the racer's career(s) are listed. Depending on point totals of individual racers, winners of Grand Nationals do not necessarily win national titles. Series and one-off championships are also listed in block.

Amateur/Junior Men
National Bicycle League (NBL)
1996 13 Expert NAG No. 1
American Bicycle Association (ABA)
1993 California District 4 (CA-04) No. 1
1994 11 Boys Northern California State Champion
1995 12 Expert World Cup Champion
1996 13 Expert National Age Group (NAG) No.1
1996 13 Expert Grandnational Champion
1997 14 Expert NAG No. 1
1998 15 Expert Race of Champions (ROC) Champion.
1998 15 Expert NAG No. 1
1999 16 Expert NAG No. 1
1999 16 Cruiser Grandnational Champion
2000 17 Expert and 17 Cruiser NAG No. 1
2001 18 Expert World Cup Champion
2001 18 Expert NAG No. 1
Fédération Internationale Amateur de Cyclisme (FIAC)*
None
International Bicycle Motocross Federation (IBMXF)*
None
Union Cycliste Internationale (UCI)*
2001 Junior Men & Junior Cruiser World Champion

*See Professional section.

USA Cycling
None

Note: USA Cycling's BMX program did not exist prior to 2007.

Professional/Elite Men
National Bicycle League (NBL)
2005 National No.1 Pro Cruiser
2006 Elite Men Grand National Champion
2006 National No.1 Pro
American Bicycle Association (ABA)
2003 Pro Cruiser Grandnational Champion
2004 World Cup Pro Time-Trial Champion.
2006 National No. 1 Pro Cruiser
International Bicycle Motocross Federation (IBMXF)*
None (defunct)
Fédération Internationale Amateur de Cyclisme (FIAC)*
None (defunct. FIAC did not have a strictly professional division during its existence).
Union Cycliste Internationale (UCI)*
2006 UCI/NBL North American Champion
2006 Supercross World Cup Elite Men's Champion
2006 Elite Men's Cruiser World Champion
2008 Elite Men Supercross World Cup Champion
2009 Elite Men Gold Medal World Champion
2009 Elite Men Gold Medal Continental Series Champion

*Note: Beginning in 1991 the IBMXF and FIAC had been holding joint world championship events as a transitional phase in merging, which began in earnest in 1993. Beginning with the 1996 season, the IBMXF and FIAC completed the merger, and both ceased to exist as independent entities, being integrated into the UCI. Beginning with the 1997 world championships held in Brighton, England, the UCI would officially hold and sanction BMX World Championships and inherited all precedents, records, streaks, etc. from both the IBMXF and FIAC.

USA Cycling
2007 Elite Men National No. 1 Pro†
On June 14, 2008 Robinson came in second at the Olympic trials at the Olympic Training Center in Chula Vista, California. Mike Day won the event with 35 points, winning two of the three runs of motos out of a scheduled four. This race format had seven racers participating in hopes of winning an automatic place on the USA BMX Olympic Team (Bubba Harris, who intended to compete, withdrew after breaking his right ankle in practice the previous Thursday). Robinson's 21 points from winning the second moto placed him in second but mathematically eliminated the possibility of overtaking Day in the winner-take-all format. As a result, the scheduled fourth moto was canceled, given concerns about racer safety (no need to endanger Day, given the potential of injury on the track, when other competitors had nothing to gain). However, Robinson was the top-ranked BMXer in the world and did well on the UCI and USA Cycling circuits, making him a much-speculated-upon choice for the fourth spot on the team, which was to be filled at the discretion of the team coach, Mike King. On June 25, 2008, that expectation was realized, and he was selected, joining Jill Kintner, Mike Day, and Kyle Bennett on the USA BMX Olympic Team.

†This is USA Cycling's inaugural national title award as a sanctioning body in the discipline of Bicycle Motocross. Robinson won the Elite Men's title on June 9, 2007, in Waterford Oaks, Michigan. Krystal Hime won for Elite women. This Championship was held under UCI rules and skill classifications as opposed to the UCI affiliated and USA Cycling owned NBL.

International Olympic Committee (IOC)
Games of the XXIX Olympiad (2008 Summer Olympics)
USA BMX Teammates Kyle Bennett, Mike Day, Jill Kintner

Discipline: Men's BMX
Location: Laoshan BMX Field Beijing, China
Number of competitors: 32
Positions:
Event Results Wednesday, August 20
Men's First Seeding Run‡:36.810sec
Men's Second Seeding Run: 36.868sec
Seconds behind leader: +1.118sec (24th place)
Seeding run leader: Mike Day 
Robinson advances to quarter-finals†
Men's quarter-finals (Overall after three motos Run 1): Third place. Qualifies for semi-finals
Event Results Thursday, August 21
Postponed due to rain. Rescheduled.
Event Results Friday, August 22
Men's semi-finals (Overall after three motos Run 1*): Third place. Qualifies for finals.
Semi-final winner (Run 1): Mike Day 
Men's final (Medal Round; one run of Main): Third place, Bronze Medal.
Silver Medal winner:** Mike Day 
Gold Medal winner:** Māris Štrombergs 

‡Time Trial data from nbcolympics.com
†quarter-finals data from nbcolympics.com
*semi-finals data from nbcolympics.com
**Final (Medal round) data from nbcolympics.com

Independent Pro Series Championships and Invitational Races
2006 International BMX Championships “Summer Festival”¥ Champion.

¥This race is a tribute to the memory of the late Mario Soto held every year in his home town of Bogotá, Colombia, and is called International BMX Championships “Summer Festival”. It is a professionals-only invitational race in which top pros are invited to participate. The first of these annual two-day events was held in 2003.

BMX product lines
"dR" Signature Series FLY Racing "Powercurve" Handlebars (2002–2007)
"dR" Signature Series Avent Complete bicycles (2004 & 2005)

Notable accolades
In 1996 he was named as one of "The 10 Hottest Amateurs" and future top Pro BMXers by BMX Plus!
He is a winner of the 2006 RideBMX Number One Rider Award (NORA)
He won the 2006 BMXer Golden Crank Pro of the Year award.

Significant injuries
Broke thumb at the 1997 ABA Fall Nationals (Day 1) in late October, 1997.  He was laid up for approximately eight weeks.
Crashed hard enough to bruise two ribs and split his helmet apart during his 15 Expert quarter-finals at the 1999 ABA Spring Nationals in Santa Clara, California.
Partially separated ACL in his shoulder early in 2002.
Dislocated his right wrist and broke his left thumb in April 2002 at the ABA U.S. Nationals in Tulare, California. Surgery was required to fix the ligaments in his wrist. He was laid up for six months. The first race after his return to the sport was the ABA Grandnational on November 30, 2002, in Tulsa, Oklahoma.

Racing traits and habits
Robinson is aerophobic. Also his confidence is much greater when he is on the bike than off. He first spoke to his girlfriend when he was on his bike, admitting he never could if he did not have it with him.

Post BMX career
Robinson officially retired from competitive BMX racing after the 2016 USA BMX Grand Nationals. He is still very active in the sport, promoting BMX racing, coaching, and developing grassroots BMX leagues.

Personal life
Robinson wed girlfriend Tiffany Lei Glenn in a ceremony in Napa, Calif., on November 14, 2009. In addition to BMX racing, Robinson has aspirations to be a Broadway theater actor/dancer/singer. He sang in his middle school choir. He went on "tour" with his now-wife performing at schools and fairgrounds.

BMX and general press magazine interviews and articles
"1993 District Number Ones" American BMXer October 1994 Vol.16 Iss.9 pg.51 One of many mini biographies of the ABA district champions of 1993.
"The Fabulous Five" Snap BMX Magazine May 2001 Vol.8 Iss.5 No.55 pg.63 One of five short articles with five racers including Bubba Harris, Ian Stoffel, Brandon Nicholls, and Clint Gower.
Donny Robinson" Transworld BMX November 2001 Vol.8 Iss.11 No.61 pg.71 A brief interview about doubling at the 2001 UCI World Championships in Men's Junior 20" and Cruiser.
"Beijing Bound" The Napa Valley Register September 14, 2007
"Small man, big plan: American Donny Robinson has eyes on BMX gold" Associated Press, USA Today December 25, 2007.

BMX magazine covers

Note: Only magazines that were in publication at the time of the racer's career(s) are listed unless specifically noted.

Bicycle Motocross Action & Go:
None
BMX Plus!:

Snap BMX Magazine & Transworld BMX:

Twenty BMX:

Moto Mag:
None
BMX World:

Bicycles Today & BMX Today (The official NBL membership publication under two names):

ABA Action, American BMXer, BMXer (The official ABA membership publication under three names):

Notes

External links
 
 
 
 
 
 The American Bicycle Association (ABA) Website.
 The National Bicycle League (NBL) Website.
 
 
 Associated Press article printed in USA Today on December 25, 2007: "Small man, big plan: American Donny Robinson has eyes on BMX gold"
 
 

1983 births
Living people
American male cyclists
BMX riders
Olympic bronze medalists for the United States in cycling
Cyclists at the 2008 Summer Olympics
Medalists at the 2008 Summer Olympics
UCI BMX World Champions (elite men)
Concussion activists
People from Napa, California